The Pink Panther is an American animated television series starring the Pink Panther and his co-stars from the original cartoon shorts in a series of brand new stories. The program was a production of Metro-Goldwyn-Mayer Animation. It was distributed by Claster Television and King World Productions and not MGM Television, despite MGM owning The Pink Panther. Unlike other animated series featuring the Pink Panther, this is the only series where he and the Little Man speak numerous lines.  Prior to this series, the Panther had only briefly spoken in a cartoon in the 60's.

The show was nominated for a Daytime Emmy Award in 1994 for Outstanding Achievement in Music Direction and Composition. As of Jan. 2023, all 60 episodes are available to watch on Pluto TV.

Premise 
The 1993 incarnation of The Pink Panther starred the legendary hip feline in series of brand new adventures, in which he dealt with different situations in a manner similar to the original Looney Tunes shorts, ranging from modern-day situations such as working as a delivery boy to outlandish situations like living in caveman days. Unlike previous television series and almost the entire theatrical run, the series was produced with the Panther capable of speaking throughout the episodes, to allow more interaction with other characters. Voiced by Matt Frewer, he was given a humorous American accent in order to appeal to younger children, which was in sharp contrast to the sophisticated British accent supplied by impressionist Rich Little who voiced the Panther briefly in two 1965 cartoon shorts, Sink Pink and Pink Ice.

Alongside the Pink Panther, a number of his co-stars from the original theatrical shorts appear in the series, including: The Inspector, who the Panther assists in the guise of an American police officer; The Ant and the Aardvark, with John Byner reprising the role of both characters; The Dogfather and his henchdogs Pugg and Louie, who were redesigned for this series; The Muscle Man from the 1968 cartoon Come On In! The Water's Pink; The Witch from the 1969 cartoon Pink-A-Rella; and "The Little Man", who like the Panther, was also designed to speak in the series, with Wallace Shawn providing his voice. The series also featured new characters, including a mask-wearing tribal witch doctor named Voodoo Man, a little red-headed girl named Thelma, and a sweet old lady named Mrs. Chubalingo and her pet parrot Jules.

Cast 
 Matt Frewer as the Pink Panther, the Whistler (ep. 5), News Anchor (ep. 59)
 Sheryl Bernstein as Eskimo Mayor
 John Byner as Charlie Ant, Blue Aardvark
 Dan Castellaneta as Voodoo Man, Muck Luck, Chef Sumo (ep 17), Fish World Ticket Man (ep 31) Weasel, Snake, (ep 16) Babe The Bull (ep 33)
 Jim Cummings as Dogfather (in "It's Just a Gypsy in My Soup"), Rolo (ep 31)
 Brian George as Pugg
 Jess Harnell as Louie, Muscle Man, Pecks (ep. 59)
 Joe Piscopo as Dogfather
 Hal Rayle as The Inspector
 Charles Nelson Reilly as Jules Parrot
 Wallace Shawn as The Little Man
 Kath Soucie as Thelma, Cleopatra
 Jo Anne Worley as Mrs. Chubalingo

Additional cast 

 Ruth Buzzi as Witch
 Hamilton Camp as Rupert (ep 31)
 Jodi Carlisle
 Nancy Cartwright
 Cathy Cavadini as Thelma (occasional understudy)
 Rickey D'Shon Collins as Lester (ep 5)
 Troy Davidson
 Eddie Deezen as Robot (ep 50)
 Mick Garris
 Phillip Glasser
 Keith David as Rhinoceros
 Barry Gordon as Bongo Cereal Founder (ep. 59)
 Paige Gosney
 Gerrit Graham
 Jennifer Hale
 Dana Hill as Alien Kid (ep 14)
 David Lodge
 Maurice LaMarche as Spartacus (ep. 59)
 Steve MacKall as Johnny Chucklehead
 Danny Mann
 Kenneth Mars as Commissioner
 Kevin Michael Richardson as Erik the Red
 Bradley Pierce as Buddy Bimmel's Son (ep. 59)
 Gwen Shepherd
 Susan Silo
 Jean Smart
 Elmarie Wendel
 Thomas F. Wilson

Production  
In 1992, MGM/UA decided to produce new Pink Panther cartoons with a twist that he would be able to speak, hoping to bring new life to the panther. That same year, MGM/UA met with its licensees to explain the changes that were made to the character and arm them with essential artwork needed to spring the panther for the brand-new series. This decision was controversial and unpopular.

Casting 
In 1993, Rich Little, who voiced the character in a few scenes of the original cartoons, was approached to reprise his role as the pink feline. However, Little did not recall voicing the character at all and turned down the offer saying giving the panther a voice would ruin the character. Producer David DePatie also felt that giving the panther a voice would "compromise the integrity of the character." But once the producers saw Matt Frewer fill in the lines for the panther, they thought it was fantastic and they accepted it.

Episodes

Season 1 (1993)

Season 2 (1994–95)

Home media 
A DVD box set called "Der rosarote Panther - Die neue Show" was released in Germany (Region 2) on February 21, 2006 through MGM. This set contains the first 40 Episodes in English, French and German on four DVDs. The set was then released in the UK from MGM and Fox on February 2, 2009; the remaining 20 episodes are yet to be released.

References

External links 
 
 
 The New Pink Panther Show (1993)

1990s American animated television series
1993 American television series debuts
1995 American television series endings
American children's animated adventure television series
American children's animated comedy television series
American children's animated fantasy television series
American animated television spin-offs
Animated television series about mammals
English-language television shows
The Pink Panther (cartoons) television series
Television series by MGM Television
Television series by Claster Television
Animated television series reboots
Television series by Metro-Goldwyn-Mayer Animation